Kiril Shivarov (15 July 1887 – 26 March 1938) was a Bulgarian artist. His work was part of the art competition at the 1932 Summer Olympics.

References

1887 births
1938 deaths
Artists from Varna, Bulgaria
Olympic competitors in art competitions